Evergood is a surname. Notable people with the surname include:

Miles Evergood (1871–1939), Australian artist
Philip Evergood (born Howard Blashki, 1901–1973), American painter, etcher, sculptor, lithographer, and writer, son of Miles